Zhao Min, birth name Minmin Temür, formally Commanderial Princess Shaomin, is one of the two female lead characters in the wuxia novel The Heaven Sword and Dragon Saber by Jin Yong. Jin Yong describes her appearance as "naturally elegant, with a bright countenance".

Fictional character biography 
Zhao Min is a Mongol princess of the Yuan dynasty. Her elder brother is Köke Temür. Her father, Chaghan Temür, the Prince of Ruyang, has been appointed by the emperor to eliminate the Ming Cult, a martial arts school seeking to overthrow the Yuan dynasty, and bring the Han Chinese wulin (martial artists' community) under the control of the Yuan government.

Zhao Min helps her father with his mission by stirring up conflict between the Ming Cult and the various martial arts schools in the wulin. Under her command, she has several martial artists serving as mercenaries in Chaghan Temür's army, including the Xuanming Elders, Huogong Toutuo's apprentices, and the "Divine Arrow Eight Heroes". She makes her first appearance in the novel by using the Ten Fragrances Tendon-Weakening Powder to poison martial artists from the six major "orthodox" schools and capture them and imprison them in Wan'an Monastery in the Yuan capital, Dadu. The powder does not kill, but it renders the victim unable to use his/her inner energy. As the six schools have recently made peace with the Ming Cult, Zhao Min intends to lure Zhang Wuji, the cult's new leader, into a trap and capture him. However, Zhang Wuji sees through her ruse and avoids being caught.

As the story progresses, Zhao Min and Zhang Wuji gradually become romantically attracted to each other, and a love triangle develops between them and Zhang Wuji's childhood friend, Zhou Zhiruo. Zhao Min even accompanies Zhang Wuji on his adventures as the first of three conditions in an agreement she made with him to free the captured martial artists. However, at one point, Zhang Wuji mistakenly believes that Zhao Min has murdered his cousin Yin Li, stolen the Heaven-Reliant Sword and Dragon-Slaying Saber, and fled with the two weapons. The real culprit is Zhou Zhiruo, who has framed Zhao Min for the murder and theft. When they reencounter each other later, Zhang Wuji refrains from killing Zhao Min even though he still thinks she is responsible and gradually begins to believe that Zhao Min is innocent as he discovers more evidence proving her innocence.

When Zhang Wuji and Zhou Zhiruo are about to be married, Zhao Min shows up and forces Zhang Wuji not to marry Zhou Zhiruo as the second condition of their earlier agreement. Zhang Wuji is reluctant, but he gives in when Zhao Min tells him she knows the whereabouts of his missing godfather, Xie Xun. Zhou Zhiruo, humiliated by Zhang Wuji's rejection, viciously attacks Zhao Min, but Zhang Wuji stops Zhou Zhiruo and saves Zhao Min.

By the end of the novel, Zhao Min decides to turn against her fellow Mongols and join Zhang Wuji because she has fallen in love with him. Zhang Wuji also concludes that Zhao Min is his true love, and the two of them want to retire from the wulin to lead a reclusive life. In the last chapter, Zhao Min tells Zhang Wuji that the third condition is to help her paint her eyebrows.

In film and television
Notable actresses who have portrayed Zhao Min in films and television series include Ho-Kau Chan (1963-5) Ching Li (1978), Liza Wang (1978), Kitty Lai (1986), Sharla Cheung (1993), Cecilia Yip (1994), Gigi Lai (2000), Alyssa Chia (2003), Ady An (2009) and Chen Yuqi (2019).

Notes

Literary characters introduced in 1961
Jin Yong characters
Condor Trilogy
Fictional princesses
Fictional women soldiers and warriors
The Heaven Sword and Dragon Saber
Fictional tai chi practitioners
Fictional Zui Quan practitioners
Fictional Shaolin kung fu practitioners
Fictional Changquan practitioners
Fictional Yuan dynasty people
Fictional Mongolian people
Fictional characters from Beijing